"Who Am I to Say" is a song written by Kim Reid, and recorded by American country music group The Statler Brothers.  Kim Reid is the daughter of Harold Reid, the bass singer of The Statler Brothers.  The song was released in August 1978 as the second single from the album Entertainers On and Off the Record.  The song reached #3 on the Billboard Hot Country Singles & Tracks chart.
The song was covered by indie artist Kyle Boreing on his 2020 EP of the same name.

Chart performance

References

1978 singles
1978 songs
The Statler Brothers songs
Song recordings produced by Jerry Kennedy
Mercury Records singles